Killjoys is a Canadian space adventure drama television series that aired on Space channel in Canada. The show was officially ordered to series on October 7, 2013, with a ten-episode pick-up. In April 2014, it was announced that Syfy would co-produce the series, and the first season premiered June 19, 2015.

Series overview

Episodes

Season 1 (2015)

Season 2 (2016)

Season 3 (2017)

Season 4 (2018)

Season 5 (2019)

References

External links
 

Killjoys